Rodolphe Cadart (born 8 August 1978) is a former professional tennis player from France.

Career
As a junior, Cadart made the boys' quarter-finals at the 1995 Australian Open and was also a quarter-finalist in the doubles at Wimbledon that year, partnering Jean-François Bachelot.

In the 1999 ERA Real Estate Clay Court Championships, held in Orlando, Cadart had a win over Australian Open winner Petr Korda.

Cadart lost a four set match to Stefan Koubek in the opening round of the 2000 Australian Open. It would be his only Grand Slam singles appearance, although he took part in the doubles at the 2003 French Open, with Richard Gasquet. The pair were defeated in the first round by Zimbabweans Wayne Black and Kevin Ullyett.

He had his best result on the ATP Tour in 2003, at Marseille, where he made the quarter-finals, beating world number 45 Max Mirnyi en route.

Challenger titles

Doubles: (1)

References

1978 births
Living people
French male tennis players
Sportspeople from Reims